The dark-breasted rosefinch (Procarduelis nipalensis) is a species of true finch in the monotypic genus Procarduelis. It is found in Bhutan, China, India, Laos, Myanmar, Nepal, Pakistan, Thailand, and Vietnam. Its natural habitats are boreal forests and subtropical or tropical high-altitude shrubland.

Taxonomy
The dark-breasted rosefinch was formerly placed in the genus Carpodacus but was moved Procarduelis based on the results from the phylogenetic analyses of mitochondrial and nuclear DNA sequences.

Subspecies 
Subspecific variation is mostly clinal, with the plumage becoming darker from west to east. There are between two-three recognised subspecies:

 P. n. nipalensis – Hodgson, 1836: The nominate, it is found in the Himalayas, from Kumaon to Nepal, Sikkim, Bhutan, and southeastern Tibet. Populations from southwestern China, south Tibet, and northern Vietnam are sometimes separated as a distinct subspecies, P. n. intensicolor.
 P. n. kangrae – Whistler, 1939: in the western Himalayas, from Kashmir to Garhwal.

Gallery

References

dark-breasted rosefinch
Birds of Nepal
Birds of Bhutan
Birds of Northeast India
Birds of China
Birds of Yunnan
dark-breasted rosefinch
Taxonomy articles created by Polbot